Amy and Wendy Engelberg are an American television writing and producing team who are sisters. They wrote and produced for Maybe This Time, Clueless, Lizzie McGuire, What I Like About You, Sonny with a Chance and Drop Dead Diva. As well as writing for television, films they worked on include Stuck in the Suburbs and Made... The Movie.

Credits
 Maybe This Time (writers, 1995–1996)
 Clueless (writers, 12 episodes, 1996–1998)
 Honey, I Shrunk the Kids: The TV Show (writers, 1 episode, 1999)
 Katie Joplin (writers, 1 episode, 1999)
 M.Y.O.B. (producers, 1 episode, 2000)
 Grosse Pointe (writers, producers, 1 episode, 2000)
 All About Us (writers, 1 episode, 2001)
 Way Downtown (executive producers, TV film, 2002)
 Regular Joe (producers, 1 episode, 2003)
 8 Simple Rules (writers, producers, 1 episode, 2003)
 Lizzie McGuire (writers, 2 episodes, 2001 & 2004)
 Darcy's Wild Life (writers, 1 episode: "Queen of the Rodeo", 2004)
 Stuck in the Suburbs (writers, TV film, 2004)
 What I Like About You (writers, consulting/executive/supervising producers, 2003–2006)
 About a Girl (writers, 2 episodes, 2008)
 Sonny with a Chance (writers, consulting producers, 2009–2010)
 Drop Dead Diva (writers, 12 episodes, 2009–2014)
 Made... The Movie (writers, TV film, 2010)
 Fuller House (writers, 5 episodes, 2015–2019)
 Daytime Divas (creators, executive producers, 10 episodes, 2016)

References

External links

American television producers
American women television producers
American television writers
Living people
Screenwriting duos
American women television writers
Place of birth missing (living people)
Year of birth missing (living people)
21st-century American women